In mathematics, Dvoretzky's theorem is an important structural theorem about normed vector spaces proved by Aryeh Dvoretzky in the early 1960s, answering a question of Alexander Grothendieck. In essence, it says that every sufficiently high-dimensional normed vector space will have low-dimensional subspaces that are approximately Euclidean. Equivalently, every high-dimensional bounded symmetric convex set has low-dimensional sections that are approximately ellipsoids.

A new proof found by Vitali Milman in the 1970s was one of the starting points for the development of asymptotic geometric analysis (also called asymptotic functional analysis or the local theory of Banach spaces).

Original formulations
For every natural number k ∈ N and every ε > 0 there exists a natural number N(k, ε) ∈ N such that if (X, ‖·‖) is any normed space of dimension N(k, ε), there exists a subspace E ⊂ X of dimension k and a positive definite quadratic form Q on E such that the corresponding Euclidean norm

on E satisfies:

In terms of the multiplicative Banach-Mazur distance d the theorem's conclusion can be formulated as:

where  denotes the standard k-dimensional Euclidean space.

Since the unit ball of every normed vector space is a bounded, symmetric, convex set and the unit ball of every Euclidean space is an ellipsoid, the theorem may also be formulated as a statement about ellipsoid sections of convex sets.

Further developments

In 1971, Vitali Milman gave a new proof of Dvoretzky's theorem, making use of the concentration of measure on the sphere to show that a random k-dimensional subspace satisfies the above inequality with probability very close to 1. The proof gives the sharp dependence on k:

where the constant C(ε) only depends on ε.

We can thus state: for every ε > 0 there exists a constant C(ε) > 0 such that for every normed space (X, ‖·‖) of dimension N, there exists a subspace E ⊂ X of dimension
k ≥ C(ε) log N and a Euclidean norm |·| on E such that 

More precisely, let SN − 1 denote the unit sphere with respect to some Euclidean structure Q on X, and let σ be the invariant probability measure on SN − 1. Then:
 there exists such a subspace E with

 

 For any X one may choose Q so that the term in the brackets will be at most

 

Here c1 is a universal constant. For given X and ε, the largest possible k is denoted k*(X) and called the Dvoretzky dimension of X.

The dependence on ε was studied by Yehoram Gordon, who showed that k*(X) ≥ c2 ε2 log N. Another proof of this result was given by Gideon Schechtman.

Noga Alon and Vitali Milman showed that the logarithmic bound on the dimension of the subspace in Dvoretzky's theorem can be significantly improved, if one is willing to accept a subspace that is close either to a Euclidean space or to a Chebyshev space. Specifically, for some constant c, every n-dimensional space has a subspace of dimension k ≥ exp(c) that is close either to ℓ or to ℓ.

Important related results were proved by Tadeusz Figiel, Joram Lindenstrauss and Milman.

References

Further reading

Banach spaces
Asymptotic geometric analysis
Theorems in functional analysis